Gustavus Hamilton, 2nd Viscount Boyne PC (Ire) (1710–1746) was an Irish politician and an enthusiastic admirer of Italy and the Carnival of Venice.

Birth and origins 

Gustavus was born in 1710, probably in Ireland. He was the eldest son of Frederick Hamilton and his wife Sophia Hamilton. His grandfather was Major-General Gustavus Hamilton who would soon become Viscount Boyne. His father was the eldest son and heir apparent but would predecease his grandfather. His paternal family was a Protestant cadet branch of the Catholic Earls of Abercorns, who in turn descended from the Scottish Clan Hamilton.

Gustavus's mother was a daughter of James Hamilton of Tollymore, near Newcastle, County Down and sister of James Hamilton, 1st Earl of Clanbrassil. Gustavus's parents had married on 1 September 1707. He was one of four siblings, who are listed in his father's article.

Honours and offices 
On 20 October 1715 King George I ennobled his grandfather as Baron Stackallan. His father was from then on styled the Honourable Frederick Hamilton, being the son of a peer. His father enjoyed this honour for less than two months as he unexpectedly died on 10 December 1715. This made young Gustavus heir apparent at the age of five. After his father's death, his mother took him to London and sent him to Westminster School. On 20  August 1717 his grandfather was advanced to Viscount Boyne and young Gustavus was styled Baron Hamilton of Stackallan as courtesy title. In 1723, aged 13, he succeeded his grandfather as 2nd Viscount Boyne. In 1736, Boyne, as he now was, was sworn of the Privy Council of Ireland. In 1737, he was appointed a commissioner of the Irish Revenue, a post that he would hold until his death in 1746.

His Irish viscountcy did not disqualify him from sitting in the British House of Commons. In 1736 he won the by-election to succeeded William Fortescue in one of the two seats of Newport, Isle of Wight, of the 8th Parliament of Great Britain and sat as Member of Parliament for this constituency until the end of the parliament in 1741.

Venice 

From January to March 1730, Boyne and Edward Walpole were in Venice enjoying the pleasures of the carnival. Immediately after their trip, Walpole, the younger son of Sir Robert Walpole, the Prime Minister of Great Britain, entered Parliament as Member for Lostwithiel in a by-election on 29 April 1730, following the death of Sir Edward Knatchbull. Boyne, however, travelled to Venice again the following winter.

In 1734, Boyne was a founder-member of the Society of Dilettanti, a group of Englishmen who had made their Grand Tour and met to discuss, and to exert their influence on, matters of taste in London. Other members of the Society included his "particular friend, the notorious rake" Francis Dashwood, 11th Baron le Despencer.

Death and timeline 
Boyne died unmarried on 18 or 20 April 1746 and was buried at Stackallen. His cousin Frederick Hamilton succeeded to the viscountcy.

See also 
House of Hamilton, for his father's and mother's family.
Viscount Boyne, for his title.

Notes and references

Notes

Citations

Sources 
 (for Boyne)
 – Ab-Adam to Basing (for Family tree)
 – Bass to Canning (for Boyne)
 – Scotland and Ireland
  – (for timeline)
 – Viscounts (for Boyne)

External links 

Portrait of Gustavus Hamilton, 2nd Viscount Boyne, copy after William Hogarth.
Gustavus Hamilton (1710–1746), Second Viscount Boyne, in Masquerade Costume by Rosalba Carriera.

 

 

1710 births
1746 deaths
British MPs 1734–1741
Members of Parliament for Newport (Isle of Wight)
Members of the Privy Council of Ireland
People educated at Westminster School, London
Viscounts in the Peerage of Ireland